Wyncie King (1884–1961) was an American illustrator, cartoonist, and caricaturist.

Life
He was an illustrator for the Louisville Courier-Journal and the Louisville Herald.
He married Hortense Flexner (1885–1973).

They moved to Philadelphia. He was a contributor to the Saturday Evening Post.
She taught at Bryn Mawr, from 1926 to 1940, and at Sarah Lawrence College from 1942 to 1950. They were friends of Susan Clay Sawitzky, and Martha Gellhorn.

His work is held at the Art Institute of Chicago.

His watercolors are held at The Filson Historical Society.
His papers are held at the Archives of American Art.
Her papers are held at the University of Louisville.

He died in Athens and is buried at the Sutton Island cemetery.

Bibliography
 Hortense Flexner, Chipper, Frederick A. Stokes, 1941
 Hortense Flexner, Wishing Window, (1942)
 Hortense Flexner, Puzzle Pond, (1948)

References

External links
 "Making Faces", Sarah Lawrence College archives
 

1884 births
1961 deaths
American illustrators
The Saturday Evening Post people